Raffaella Lamera (born 13 April 1983) is an Italian female high jumper, who participated at the 2011 World Championships in Athletics.

Achievements

National titles
She won 6 national championships at senior level.
Italian Athletics Championships
High jump: 2009, 2011
Italian Indoor Athletics Championships
High jump: 2008, 2010, 2011, 2012

See also
 Italian all-time top lists - High jump

References

External links
 

1983 births
Italian female high jumpers
World Athletics Championships athletes for Italy
Living people
21st-century Italian women